The Tallis Festival is a music festival based on the work of the composer Thomas Tallis. It is hosted by Exmoor Singers of London, which forms the Tallis Festival Choir for one weekend every 12 to 18 months. The festival always includes Thomas Tallis's Spem in alium for 40-part choir, but in addition has commissioned new 40-part works by modern composers, as companion pieces to Spem in alium. In 2007 the Festival was recognised by the BBC for its contribution to new music and highlights from the Festival were broadcast on BBC Radio 3 on 28 October 2007.

The Festival originated from Tallis Performance Weekends, held periodically over a number of years. The original concept was to bring choral friends together for intense rehearsals from a Friday evening through to a public concert on the Sunday evening. Choirs of between 100 and 160 singers are formed with choral singers from around London and further afield (including France, Hungary, Finland and Japan).

New 40-part choral works
 
In 2006, a new 40-part work was commissioned and given its first performance: Tentatio, from Finnish composer Jaakko Mäntyjärvi. Tentatio, meaning Temptation, is based on a Latin biblical text about Christ spending 40 days in the wilderness and being tempted by the Devil.  Instead of eight 5-part choirs as used by Tallis, Mäntyjärvi wrote the work for five 8-part choirs, with the fifth choir being formed entirely of basses and baritones and depicting the devil.

In 2007, another new 40-part work was commissioned: Love You Big as the Sky, from Mancunian composer Peter McGarr, subtitled 'a Lindisfarne Love Song' and inspired by the island on the Northumbrian coast of England. The text is extensive and covers poems about Lindisfarne, and the detailed geography of the area, including ship wrecks and lighthouses.  It is also a love song and includes text taken from a valentine's day card as part of its inspiration. The first performance of Love You Big as the Sky was broadcast in full on BBC Radio 3 as part of the Festival coverage.

References

External links
Exmoor Singers website
Jaakko Mäntyjärvi's website
Peter McGarr's website
BBC Radio 3 The Choir

London choirs
Music festivals in London